William Da Corean Hatcher (born August 8, 1984) is an American professional basketball player who last played for Iraklis of the Greek Basket League. He is a 6 ft 2 in (1.88 m) tall point guard–shooting guard.

High school career
Hatcher played high school basketball at Carman-Ainsworth High School in Flint, Michigan. In his senior year of high school, he was an All-State Honorable Mention selection. He was also twice an All-First Team Conference selection and team captain.

College career
After high school, Hatcher played college basketball at Miami University with the Miami RedHawks, from 2002 to 2006. In his senior season (2005–06) at Miami, Ohio, Hatcher was selected to the All-MAC Conference First team. He was also named the MAC's Eastern Division player of the week twice, and was also voted as the MAC's "Best All-Around Guard".

Professional career
Hatcher's professional career began in 2006. He signed his first contract to play in Germany, with the German club Dragons Rhöndorf of the German 2nd Division. After that, Hatcher played in Romania, Czech Republic, Cyprus, Israel, Greece, France, Belgium, and Serbia.

On October 8, 2015, he signed a contract with his former team PAOK. On August 1, 2016, he signed a one-year contract with the Serbian team Partizan.

On June 11, 2017, Hatcher signed with Italian club Dinamo Sassari.

On August 6, 2018, Hatcher returned to the Greek team PAOK Thessaloniki for a third stint. The following season, he moved to Peristeri.

On November 27, 2020 he joined Iraklis of the Greek Basket League.

Personal life
Hatcher's cousin, Charlie Bell, also played college basketball at Michigan State, with the Michigan State Spartans, and he also played in the NBA with the Phoenix Suns, Dallas Mavericks, Milwaukee Bucks, and the Golden State Warriors.

References

External links
 Official Website
 Will Hatcher Miami RedHawks profile
 Will Hatcher at draftexpress.com
 Will Hatcher at eurobasket.com
 Will Hatcher at eurocupbasketball.com
 Will Hatcher at esake.gr  
 Will Hatcher at realgm.com

1984 births
Living people
African-American basketball players
American men's basketball players
American expatriate basketball people in Belgium
American expatriate basketball people in Cyprus
American expatriate basketball people in the Czech Republic
American expatriate basketball people in France
American expatriate basketball people in Germany
American expatriate basketball people in Greece
American expatriate basketball people in Israel
American expatriate basketball people in Italy
American expatriate basketball people in Romania
American expatriate basketball people in Serbia
Basketball players from Flint, Michigan
BK Děčín players
CSU Sibiu players
Dinamo Sassari players
Hapoel Gilboa Galil Elyon players
Iraklis Thessaloniki B.C. players
Keravnos B.C. players
KK Partizan players
Lega Basket Serie A players
Miami RedHawks men's basketball players
P.A.O.K. BC players
Peristeri B.C. players
Point guards
Shooting guards
Spirou Charleroi players
STB Le Havre players
21st-century African-American sportspeople
20th-century African-American people